This is a list of all cricketers who have played First-class cricket for the Hawke's Bay cricket team in New Zealand. Seasons given are first and last seasons; the player did not necessarily play in all the intervening seasons.

A

 John A'Deane, 1893/94
 Cyril Allcott, 1920/21
 Norman James Cecil Anderson, 1909/10
 Rudolph Godfreid Anderson, 1919/20
 Ernest Andrews, 1898/99
 Peter Ashcroft, 1905/06-1911/12
 William Martin Ashton, 1883/84
 Hendrick Osborne Audinwood, 1906/07

B

 Bert Bailey, 1905/06-1910/11
 Arthur Merritt Beale, 1893/94-1895/96
 F Bell, 1886/87
 Arthur Cochrane Bennett, 1892/93-1896/97
 Bill Bernau, 1914/15
 John Alick Betts, 1908/09
 Bob Bishop, 1914/15-1920/21
 Larry Bishop, 1903/04
 Henry Blamires, 1911/12-1913/14
 Roland George Blinko, 1913/14
 Jack Board, 1910/11-1914/15
 Frederick Bottrell, 1912/13
 Walter William Boulnois, 1912/13
 Jim Bradburn, 1919/20-1920/21
 Robert Braithwaite, 1885/86
 Edward Tauria Broughton, 1883/84
 Sydney Cecil Brownette, 1910/11-1912/13
 Ralph Willett Bruce, 1891/92-1896/97
 William Beverly Buchanan, 1884/85
 James Buck, 1886/87-1887/88

C

 Colin Campbell, 1920/21
 Frank Cane, 1920/21
 Davis Canning, 1893/94-1899/1900
 Charlie Cato, 1891/92-1907/08
 Robert Chadwick, 1913/14
 Leonard Andrews Charles, 1919/20
 William Vernon Clarke, 1913/14
 N Cohen, 1919/20
 Basil Walter Cotterill, 1901/02-1908/09
 George Robert Cotterill, 1899/1900
 Tommy Creed, 1910/11-1913/14
 Hugh Edward Crosse, 1919/20

D

 Dick Dalgleish, 1906/07-1907/08
 David Davis, 1920/21
 Kenrick Holt Dean, 1914/15
 Tom Dent, 1900/01-1901/02
 John Downes, 1884/85
 John Drummond, 1903/04

E

 Herbert Douglas Earney, 1910/11
 Charles Edwards, 1884/85-1887/88
 Harry Ellis, 1913/14-1914/15

F

 Harry Fannin, 1892/93-1899/1900
 Arthur Fenton, 1903/04-1910/11
 George Henry Fernley, 1893/94
 Walter Philip Finch, 1884/85
 Alexander Abercrombie Freeman, 1887/88
 Peter Robertson Fulton, 1900/01-1920/21
 Frederick Fulton, 1883/84

G

 Samuel James Geake, 1913/14-1914/15
 Clifton Stewart Geddis, 1914/15-1920/21
 William Alexander James Gibson, 1895/96-1897/98
 Joseph Jarvis Gifford, 1919/20-1920/21
 Harold Desmond Gold-Smith, 1905/06
 Arthur Gore, 1891/92-1901/02
 Frederick Herbert Gossage, 1893/94
 Milton Reid Grant, 1911/12
 Cyril John Gregory, 1883/84

H

 W K Hall, 1904/05-1905/06
 Reginald Gerard Hallamore, 1898/99-1906/07
 George Hawke, 1900/01-1910/11
 Bill Hawkins, 1887/88-1894/95
 W Hayward, 1885/86-1886/87
 Fitz Hill, 1891/92-1901/02
 Jack Hindmarsh, 1907/08-1913/14
 Harris Hindmarsh, 1920/21
 William Henry Hitchens, 1913/14
 Arthur George Howe, 1886/87
 Arthur Howard, 1904/05-1905/06
 Bill Hughes, 1891/92-1905/06
 James Hussey, 1901/02

J

 Norman Jacobsen, 1919/20-1920/21
 J Johnson, 1919/20
 Charles Edgar Johnston, 1896/97

K

 Roland Ralph Kennedy, 1920/21

L

 Fred Laws, 1897/98
 Charles Levers, 1908/09
 Thomas William Lewis, 1896/97-1898/99
 W J Love, 1920/21
 Thomas Lowry, 1891/92
 Edward Reginald Ludbrook, 1891/92-1895/96
 Hugh Lusk, 1891/92-1908/09

M

 Mac Macassey, 1900/01-1912/13
 George Marshall, 1893/94-1901/02
 A Martin, 1896/97-1897/98
 Harry Martin, 1883/84-1897/98
 James Henry Martin, 1883/84-1896/97
 Bert Miller, 1914/15
 Charles Mills, 1919/20
 George Mills, 1894/95

N

 Eric John Napier, 1913/14-1920/21
 Richard George Nash, 1886/87
 Frank Nelson, 1908/09-1909/10
 Frederick Montague Nelson, 1892/93-1897/98
 James Nelson, 1912/13
 Gollan McLean Newton, 1883/84-1886/87

O

 Jack O'Brien, 1905/06-1920/21
 William James O'Connell, 1919/20-1920/21
 Joe Ongley, 1901/02

P

 James Paterson, 1914/15-1920/21
 Logan Paterson, 1886/87-1887/88
 Gavin Graham Peacock, 1891/92
 Richard William Percy, 1884/85-1892/93
 George Prain, 1887/88

R

 Philip Stanley Reaney, 1905/06
 Bill Redgrave, 1906/07-1908/09
 Arthur Rees, 1896/97
 Joseph P. Riley, 1885/86
 B Ryan, 1903/04-1910/11

S

 Popham Sainsbury, 1893/94-1894/95
 William Salmon, 1885/86
 Harry Seed, 1913/14
 Herbert Sharp, 1904/05
 Charles Smith, 1891/92-1892/93
 Edward Smyrk, 1909/10-1912/13
 Roy Spackman, 1913/14-1919/20
 John Spivey, 1884/85-1885/86
 George Staite, 1895/96-1897/98
 George Robert Stevens, 1911/12-1920/21
 John Stevens, 1919/20
 Arthur Stubbs, 1887/88

T

 John Taiaroa, 1891/92-1898/99
 Ernest Denton Tanner, 1883/84-1885/86
 Harry Fleetwood Thompson, 1885/86
 W Torkington, 1904/05
 Herbert Tottenham, 1903/04
 Albert Trott, 1901/02
 Charles Tuke, 1884/85
 Hugh Tuke, 1904/05

V

 Leslie George Vivian, 1912/13

W

 George Mason White, 1884/85-1905/06
 Norman Moore White, 1907/08
 Peter White, 1910/11
 Allen Marsh Williams, 1883/84
 George Coldham Williams, 1883/84
 Heathcote Williams, 1891/92
 Heathcote Beetham Williams, 1891/92-1894/95
 John Williams, 1903/04
 F E Wilson, 1893/94
 Harry Wilson, 1896/97-1900/01
 Jack Wolstenholme, 1886/87-1898/99
 James Wood, 1884/85-1886/87

Y

 William Charles Yates, 1883/84
 Billy Young, 1896/97-1905/06

Notes

References

Hawke's Bay